In a Winter Light is the third studio album by English comedian and actor Alexander Armstrong. It was released on 24 November 2017 as Armstrong's first Christmas album, and was recorded with the City of Prague Orchestra, Choir of New College Oxford, RAF Squadronaires Big Band and Jools Holland. It peaked at number 24 on the UK Albums Chart, achieving less commercial success than his first two albums. In a Winter Light contains two compositions written by Armstrong himself, "I Still Believe In Christmas" and "This Glorious Morrow".

Track listing

Critical reception 
In a Winter Light was met with mainly positive reviews from the professional arts journalism website The Arts Desk, who called it "a pleasantly traditional affair". They said, "Unfortunately, Armstrong's baritone is not suited to everything. Take "White Winter Hymnal" by Fleet Foxes. The original was an ethereal piece of folk-rock. This choral version is so mannered it's almost like an Armstrong and Miller comedy sketch."

Charts

References 

Alexander Armstrong albums
2017 albums
Rhino Entertainment albums